The 1989 League Legends Cup is an annual rugby league match between NRL clubs the Canberra Raiders and the Wests Tigers. The match is played to commemorate the 1989 Grand Final, which has been called the greatest Grand Final ever. The grand final was actually between the Raiders and the Balmain Tigers, but since the Tigers merged with the Western Suburbs Magpies in 2000, the 1989 League Legend Cup match is played between the Raiders and the joint venture. The cup is contested only once per season, so in the years where the Raiders and Tigers are scheduled to meet twice, the clubs decide which of those two matches will decide the winner of the trophy. The first Cup match was in Round 5 of the 2008 NRL season.

Games Played

Head To Head

See also

References

External links

Canberra Raiders matches
Wests Tigers matches
Rugby league trophies and awards
Awards established in 2008
Lea
National Rugby League
Rugby league rivalries
Rugby league in Sydney
Sports rivalries in Australia
1989 awards
2008 establishments in Australia